xyzzy or XYZZY may refer to:

Xyzzy (computing), a magic word from the Colossal Cave Adventure computer game, later a metasyntactic variable or a video game cheat code
Xyzzy (mnemonic), memory trick used in mathematics
XYZZY Awards, for interactive fiction

See also
Zzyzx (disambiguation)